The Nymphe class was a class of four screw composite sloops built for the Royal Navy between 1885 and 1888.  As built they were armed with four 4-inch guns and four 3-pounder guns.

Design

Built to a design by William Henry White, Director of Naval Construction, Nymphe and her sister ships were constructed of an iron frame sheathed with teak and copper (hence 'composite'), and powered by both sails and a steam engine delivering  through twin screws.

Employment

Although made obsolete by quickly changing naval technology, these sloops were ideal for operations in the far distant outposts of the British Empire in the late 19th century.  Swallow served on the South Atlantic Station, Buzzard on the North America and West Indies Station and Nymphe on the Pacific Station. Daphne served on the China Station, and it was in June 1900 that she brought ammunition into Shanghai during the Boxer Rebellion.  Nymphe and Buzzard survived until after World War I as harbour training ships.

Ships

References

External links

Sloop classes
 
 Nymphe